A. Freeborn Brown III (February 4, 1915 – July 25, 1998) was an American politician and lawyer from Maryland. He served as a member of the Maryland House of Delegates, representing Harford County, from 1951 to 1954.

Early life
A. Freeborn Brown III was born on February 4, 1915, in Havre de Grace, Maryland, to A. Freeborn Brown. His father was a Baltimore lawyer and served as city attorney in Havre de Grace. Brown attended public school in Havre de Grace and graduated from Loyola High School in 1933. He attended Loyola College and graduated from the University of Maryland in 1937. He graduated from the University of Maryland School of Law in 1941.

Career
In 1940, Brown joined his father's law practice on Main Street in Bel Air, Maryland. During World War II, Brown served as a counterintelligence officer and was stationed in Europe. Brown practiced law with Brown, Brown and Brown until around 1996. In the 1970s, Brown served as city attorney of Havre de Grace.

Brown was a Democrat. He served as a member of the Maryland House of Delegates, representing Harford County, from 1951 to 1954.

Personal life
Brown married Catherine T. Healy in 1943. They had four sons and two daughters, Augustus F. IV, J. Patrick, Thomas F., Michael D., Mary Louise and Teresa. Brown moved from Havre de Grace to Bel Air in 1984.

Brown died on July 25, 1998, at his home in Bel Air.

References

1915 births
1998 deaths
People from Havre de Grace, Maryland
People from Bel Air, Maryland
University System of Maryland alumni
University of Maryland Francis King Carey School of Law alumni
Military intelligence officers of World War II
Democratic Party members of the Maryland House of Delegates
Maryland lawyers